Forgotten Songs of Some Old Yesterday is a compilation album released in 1980 by folk musician John Stewart, former member of the Kingston Trio. This album was only released in Great Britain and includes the otherwise unavailable "Rodeo Mary".

Track listing
All compositions by John Stewart except where noted.
Side one
 "Wheatfield Lady" (John Stewart, David Kershenbaum) – 2:13
 From a single released in 1974. Produced by David Kershenbaum
 "You Can't Look Back" – 1:43
 From the album The Phoenix Concerts 1974
 "July, You're a Woman" – 3:29
 From the album The Phoenix Concerts 1974
 "Let the Big Horse Run" – 4:01
 From the album John Stewart in Concert 1980
 "Cody" – 3:13
 From the album The Phoenix Concerts 1974
 "California Bloodlines" – 4:40
 From the album The Phoenix Concerts 1974
 "Mother Country" – 5:30
 From the album The Phoenix Concerts 1974
Side two
 "All Time Woman" – 3:18
 From the album Cannons in the Rain 1973
 "Anna on a Memory" – 3:05
 From the album Cannons in the Rain 1973
 "Armstrong" – 2:33
 From the album Cannons in the Rain 1973
 "Cannons in the Rain" – 3:21
 From the album Cannons in the Rain 1973
 "Hung on a Heart (Of a Man Back Home)" – 3:51
 From the album Wingless Angels 1975
 "Road Away" – 3:03
 From the album Cannons in the Rain 1973
 "Rodeo Mary" (John Stewart, Michael Cannon) – 3:23
 Previously unreleased track. Outtake from the Wingless Angels sessions.

References

1980 compilation albums
John Stewart (musician) albums
Albums produced by Nick Venet
albums produced by David Kershenbaum
RCA Records compilation albums